West Vigo High School is a public high school located in West Terre Haute, Indiana. As the name implies, the school's district covers the western portion of Vigo County.

It is the only school in Indiana that has a dome, called the Green Dome. The middle school is connected with the high school. West Vigo High School varsity sports teams include: baseball, basketball, soccer, softball, tennis, football, track, cross country, swimming, and golf.

See also
 List of high schools in Indiana

References

External links
 Official Site

Schools in Vigo County, Indiana
Educational institutions in the United States with year of establishment missing
Public high schools in Indiana
1961 establishments in Indiana